Fun in the Barracks (French: Les Gaîtés de l'escadron  or Les Gaietés de l'escadron) is a 1932 French comedy film directed by Maurice Tourneur and starring Raimu, Jean Gabin and Fernandel. It was based on a play by Georges Courteline and Edouard Nores. Tourneur was remaking the story, having previously filmed a silent version in 1913. The film was one of the most expensive made by Tourneur and was a popular commercial hit.

Synopsis
The film is set in 1885. It focuses on a group of troops, a mix of regulars and reservists, and their different responses to the daily military routines. A crisis emerges when a General pays a visit while two deserters are still absent.

Cast
 Raimu as Le capitaine Hurluret 
 Jean Gabin as Fricot 
 Fernandel as Vanderague 
 René Donnio as Laplote 
 Charles Camus as Adjudant Flick 
 Pierre Labry as Potiron 
 Frédéric Munié as Lieutenant Mousseret 
 Lucien Nat as Maréchal des Logis chef Barnot 
 Pierre Ferval as Brigadier Vergisson
 Georges Bever as La Guillaumette 
 Paul Azaïs as Croquebol 
 Roland Armontel as Barchetti 
 Louis Cari as Fourrier Bernot  
 Henry Roussel as Le général 
 Ketty Pierson as La charcutière 
 Jacqueline Brizard as La blanchisseuse 
 Mady Berry as Madame Bijou - la cantinière

References

Bibliography
 Waldman, Harry. Maurice Tourneur: The Life and Films. McFarland, 2008.

External links

1932 films
1930s historical comedy films
French historical comedy films
1930s French-language films
Films directed by Maurice Tourneur
French films based on plays
Films set in France
Films set in the 1880s
Remakes of French films
Sound film remakes of silent films
Military humor in film
Pathé films
French black-and-white films
1930s French films